2nd Lt. Leonard Robert Willette (1921 - September 22, 1944) was a World War II Tuskegee Airman fighter pilot who was killed in action flying over Germany while protecting a group of American bombers.

Early life
Willette was born in Belleville, New Jersey to Lawerence and Leonora Willette, one of six siblings, and graduated from Belleville High School in 1939, where he competed on the school's track team. After graduation, he attended New York University. Willette had been granted a commission to attend the United States Military Academy at West Point by Senator William Warren Barbour, but turned down the opportunity in order to enlist into the Army Air Corps after the bombing of Pearl Harbor.

Military service
Willette earned his wings in February 1944. On September 22, 1944, he was flying a P-51 Mustang that was escorting a group of B-17s bombers on a mission to Munich, Germany when his plane lost oil pressure and crashed. Willette's body was later recovered and buried in a cemetery in Rechtmehring, Germany. He was one of 66 Tuskegee Airmen killed in action during World War II.

Legacy
On February 24, 2018, Willette's hometown of Belleville, New Jersey renamed a street in his honor.

References

External links

1921 births
1944 deaths
Tuskegee Airmen
United States Army Air Forces personnel killed in World War II
Belleville High School (New Jersey) alumni
New York University alumni
People from Belleville, New Jersey
Aviators from New Jersey
African-American aviators
Aviators killed in aviation accidents or incidents in Germany